Munson is a village in central Alberta, Canada. It is located 13 km north of the Town of Drumheller along Highway 9 and the Canadian National Railway tracks.

History 
Prior to the end of World War I, Munson was the site of a Ukrainian Canadian internment camp where non-citizen immigrant prisoners laboured on the railway. The camp, which remained open until March 21, 1919, consisted of shelters made of railway cars.

Demographics 

In the 2016 Census of Population conducted by Statistics Canada, the Village of Munson recorded a population of 192 living in 82 of its 89 total private dwellings, a  change from its 2011 population of 204.

See also 
List of communities in Alberta
List of villages in Alberta

References 

1911 establishments in Alberta
Villages in Alberta